Galagedara may refer to:
Galagedara, Central Province, Sri Lanka
any of six different places called Galagedara, in North Western Province, Sri Lanka:
Galagedara (7°19′N 79°57′E)
Galagedara (7°26′N 80°02′E)
Galagedara (7°32′N 80°08′E)
Galagedara (7°36′N 80°18′E)
Galagedara (7°36′N 80°23′E)
Galagedara (7°46′N 80°10′E)
Galagedara, Western Province, Sri Lanka